Twelveheads Methodist church is a Methodist church located in the village of Twelveheads, near Truro in Cornwall, UK. The chapel is most famous for Billy Bray who would have gone to a church here or near here when he was alive. He may have preached at this church.

Twelveheads Methodist church is a simple rectangular structure which is well decorated with a pipe organ in an organ chamber at the front of the chapel. The pipe organ can be found in the National Pipe Organ Register.

References

Methodist churches in Cornwall